Greg Rowe (born 1964 in Adelaide, South Australia) is an Australian former child actor who starred in Australian films such as Storm Boy (1976) and Blue Fin (1978), both based on novels by Colin Thiele. His last film was Freedom (1982), directed by Academy Award nominee Scott Hicks. As of 2016, he lives with his wife and two children in Toronto, Ontario, Canada.

References

Bibliography
 Holmstrom, John. The Moving Picture Boy: An International Encyclopaedia from 1895 to 1995. Norwich, Michael Russell, 1996, p. 380-351-352.

External links 
 

1964 births
Australian male child actors
Australian male film actors
Living people
Male actors from Adelaide